Mërgim Mustafë Mavraj (born 9 June 1986) is a former professional footballer who played as a centre-back. Born in Germany, he represented the Albania national team from 2012 until 2020. Mavraj previously played for Germany U21 team, as well as spending his professional career in Germany, his place of birth, from 2005 to 2018 and again from 2019.

Club career

Early career
Mavraj was born in Hanau, West Germany to ethnic Albanian parents from Istok, Kosovo. He started playing football at age of 10 where and his first club was Sportfreunde Seligenstadt in 1996. Then he joined Kickers Offenbach in 1997, where he stayed for six years until 2003. He spent the 2003–04 season at SG Rosenhöhe Offenbach before joining SV Darmstadt 98, where he played for the under-19 side for the 2004–05 campaign. He became a key member of the U-19s, starting in 23 league games and scoring three goals in the process, but his side finished bottom of the table with just four wins in 26 games all season.

Darmstadt 98
Mavraj was promoted to the senior SV Darmstadt 98 side during the 2005–06 season, making his professional debut on 18 March 2006 against SC Pfullendorf in the Regionalliga Süd. He started the game in defence, but was sent off in the 51st minute after receiving his second yellow card in the 3–1 away loss. In total during the 2005–06 season he made 13 appearances and scored two goals, helping his side finish fifth in the league. The next season would be his first as a professional footballer, where he played in 25 league games without scoring. His strong performances in the first half of the season did not go unnoticed as he was called up by Germany U21 coach Dieter Eilts for a friendly against Italy in February 2007. The 2006–07 season was a memorable one for Mavraj despite his side finished the campaign 16th in the table.

VfL Bochum
On 1 August 2007, signed to VfL Bochum for 350,000 € and joined to reserve team that then played at Oberliga Westfalen. On 10 May 2008, he made his debut in the first at the 3–1 victory against Karlsruhe. A week later, managed to record another show of which also scored the team in his debut at the 2–1 loss to Hansa Rostock, at the reserve is made seven appearances and scored one and promoted with the club to Regionalliga West. At 2008–09 season, his status at the first team improved and he made 23 appearances and helped his team to stay in the Bundesliga.

Greuther Fürth

On 23 January 2011, Mavraj signed to SpVgg Greuther Fürth for 200,000 €. On 29 January 2011 he made his debut at the 2–2 draw against Alemannia Aachen at New Tivoli stadium, coming on as a substitute for Stephan Schröck in the 90th minute. He scored his first goal on 31 July 2011 in a DFB-Pokal game against Eimsbütteler TV finished in a 10–0 victory with Mavraj scoring the opening goal in the 17th minute. On 2 October 2011, he scored his second goal for Greuther Fürth at the 2–2 draw against Karlsruher SC at the 91st of the game. At the 2011–12 season's end, Greuther Fürth got promoted to the Bundesliga.

On 7 August 2012, Mavraj took over from central defensive partner Thomas Kleine as the team captain for the 2012–13 Bundesliga season. He was elected captain by his teammates in a secret ballot, finishing ahead of Thomas Kleine, Gerald Asamoah, Stephan Fürstner and Milorad Peković.

On 3 March 2014, Mavraj scored the victory goal for his team against FSV Frankfurt and Greuther Fürth managed to win three gold points that keep the race for the return to the Bundesliga. The match came from behind two times, as the home team managed to score the opening goal in the tenth minute with Niko Gießelmann, then Frankfurt jumped in attack and managed to overthrow Greuther Fürth in the final minutes of the first-half, where it was Denis Epstein, who scored the equalizer with a penalty, and later was the fellow Albania national striker Edmond Kapllani who managed to stop the ball in the net. Over minutes Greuther Fürth managed to make balance exactly from the penalty, and then Mavraj managed to score in the 87th minute the winning goal for his team.

Greuther Fürth finished third in the 2013–14 2. Bundesliga, advancing to the play-off promotion with Hamburger SV as the 16th position of the Bundesliga. They played in a two-legged game, were the first leg match played in Hamburg ended in a goalless draw with Mavraj playing the full 90-minutes and the second-leg match finishing in the 1–1 draw with Mavraj playing another full 90-minute match, as the two-legged match finished 1–1 on aggregate with Greuther Fürth losing on the away goals rule. Mavraj finished the season with a total of 30 appearances including one match played in the DFB-Pokal.

1. FC Köln
Mavraj had declared early that if Greuther Fürth didn't win promotion to the Bundesliga for the next season, he would leave the club after his contract expired on 30 June 2014 and on 19 May 2014, 2. Bundesliga winners and thus just recently promoted to the Bundesliga, 1. FC Köln announced to have signed Mavraj on a three-year contract until 30 June 2017.

On 19 December 2015, Mavraj returned to the football fields after seven months absence, playing the last minutes in the 2–1 triumph over Borussia Dortmund in Bundesliga. That was his 100th Bundesliga appearance.

Hamburger SV
On 27 December 2016, Mavraj signed with fellow Bundesliga team Hamburger SV until 30 June 2019 for a transfer fee of reportedly €1.8 million. Following an impressive performance in his 5th match for Hamburger SV on 12 February 2017 which helped his team to take a clear 3–0 victory against the eventual runners-up of the 2016–17 Bundesliga RB Leipzig, Mavraj was selected for the team of the weak by kicker.

On 31 January 2017, Mavraj was selected in the best eleven of the first half of the 2016–17 Bundesliga in a voting competition where he took 26% of total votes, one percent less than Sokratis Papastathopoulos of Borussia Dortmund, leaving behind centre-backs such as Bayern Munich duo Mats Hummels and Jérôme Boateng.

In the start of the 2017–18 season, on 10 August 2017 Mavraj was named Vice-captain of Hamburger SV among fellow defender Kyriakos Papadopoulos.

Aris
On 5 September 2018, Aris announced the signing of Mavraj, on a two-year contract. On 2 January 2019, after a rather mediocre season, he resolved his contract with the club, ahead of a move to  2. Bundesliga club FC Ingolstadt. On 12 October 2018, Mavraj announced that he had obtained a Greek passport.

FC Ingolstadt
On 3 January 2019, FC Ingolstadt 04 announced the signing of Mavraj, on a 1.5-year contract.

International career

Germany youth national teams
Mavraj represented Germany at various youth levels.

Albania
Mavraj was eligible to play for Albania because his parents are ethnic Albanians from Kosovo. He started applying for the Albanian citizenship in September 2006 along with Besart Berisha, Genc Mehmeti and Alban Dragusha, following the recommendations of Hans-Peter Briegel before he resigned from his role as the manager of the Albania national team. Mavraj got involved for the first time with Albania in 2006 at the age of 19 in a crowding with young talent players by FSHF and the Albania national football team's coach Otto Barić which rated him well and asked to give him the Albanian passport. Mavraj received the Albanian citizenship on 27 September 2006 along with Berisha. Then he called up from Albania national under-21 football team but he refused as he wanted directly the senior team., feeling undervalued by the FSHF.

Germany U21
Following his refusal to represent Albania in February 2007, he received German citizenship later the same month and immediately joined the German U21 national team. He made his debut for the U21 side on 21 February 2007 against Italy in a friendly, coming on as a 67th-minute substitute for Torben Joneleit in the goalless draw. Following his debut for Germany U21, he had trouble breaking into the team and did not feature again for over two years. His next and final game for Germany U21 came on 31 March 2012 against Belarus in 1–1 draw, with Mavraj playing the full game at centre back.

Albania national team
FSHF gave Mavraj a chance to play international football at a senior level by permitting the Albanian manager at the time Josip Kuže to call him up for a friendly in Tirana against Northern Ireland on 3 March 2010. This was his first senior international call up, and one which he accepted. However, just one day prior to the team meeting up to begin preparing for the game Mavraj backed down and did not show up, much to the dislike of the FSHF and the Albanian fans, who accused him of being a traitor for rejecting Albania twice. Mavraj himself however rejected this notion of rejecting Albania, stating that he asked for more time to decide on his international future, nonetheless the FSHF admitted that Mavraj would never be allowed to play for Albania in the future. The sudden change of mind regarding his international call up was reportedly due to a conversation he had on the phone with Matthias Sammer, who was technical director of the German Football Association at the time. Sammer told Mavraj that he may have a future with the German national team and that he old be considered for an invitation to the senior side after the 2010 FIFA World Cup. However, following difficulties at club level with VfL Bochum and relegation to the 2. Bundesliga at the end of the 2009–10 season, his dream of playing for Germany had become highly unrealistic.

Following good performances with new club Greuther Fürth he grabbed the attention of the FSHF for a third time, this time more reluctantly as Albania were in need of a quality defender. Despite making it clear that he would never play for Albania, the FSHF opened the door to Mavraj once again. He publicly announced in 2012 that he would make himself available for selection by the national team, which Gianni De Biasi did for friendlies against Qatar and Iran.

He made his senior international debut against Qatar on 22 May 2012 at Campo de Fútbol de Vallecas, Madrid, Spain in a game which ended in a 2–1 victory for Albania.

2014 FIFA World Cup qualification
He made it his first official debut for Albania on 7 September 2012 in the opening match of the 2014 FIFA World Cup qualification Group E against Cyprus, playing the full 90 minutes, which finished in the home 3–1 victory. Mavraj missed out 7th and 8th matches in September 2013 due to the injury but recovered in time for two last games against Switzerland and Cyprus on 11 and 15 October 2013. For his performances during the qualifiers, Mavraj among Ervin Bulku were rated as impenetrable and very actives on the field.

Mavraj scored the first goal for the Albania team on 8 June 2014 against San Marino, where he played as a starter and scored in the 28th minute the opening goal of a 3–0 victory.

UEFA Euro 2016 qualifiers
Mavraj started another qualification campaign, the UEFA Euro 2016 qualifiers, as on 7 September 2014 he played a full 90-minutes match in the 1–0 away victory against Portugal. He made it a good performance in this opening match of the qualifiers and was included in the best eleven team of the first round matches of the UEFA Euro 2016 qualifying.

On 14 November 2014, Mavraj scored his second goal for Albania during the "Group I" centralised friendly against the Euro 2016 hosts France. Mavraj scored the opening goal in the 40th minute after an assist by Elseid Hysaj. Its goal was equaled and the match finished in the 1–1 draw.

Euro 2016
On 21 May 2016, Mavraj was named in Albania's preliminary 27-man squad for UEFA Euro 2016, and in Albania's final 23-man UEFA Euro squad on 31 May. On 28 May, he captained his side for the first time during the Euro 2016 warm-up match against Qatar, which ended in a 3–1 win, becoming the youngest ever captain.

Mavraj played every minute of all Group A matches as Albania were eliminated by ranking in the third place behind hosts France against which they lost 2–0 and Switzerland against which they also lost 1–0 in the opening match and ahead of Romania by beating them 1–0 in the closing match with a goal by Armando Sadiku. Albania finished the group in the third position with three points and with a goal difference –2, and was ranked last in the third-placed teams, which eventually eliminated them.

Personal life
His first name Mërgim means 'migration' in Albanian.

Career statistics

Club

International

Scores and results list Albania's goal tally first, score column indicates score after each Mavraj goal.

Honours
Greuther Fürth
 2. Bundesliga: 2011–12

References

External links
 
 
 
 Mërgim Mavraj profile at FSHF.org
 Mërgim Mavraj – Euro 2016 profile at FSHF.org

1986 births
Living people
Sportspeople from Hanau
Footballers from Hesse
Kosovo Albanians
German people of Albanian descent
Sportspeople of Albanian descent
German people of Kosovan descent
Albanian people of Kosovan descent
Albanian people of German descent
Association football central defenders
Albanian footballers
Albania international footballers
German footballers
Germany under-21 international footballers
Germany youth international footballers
SV Darmstadt 98 players
VfL Bochum players
VfL Bochum II players
SpVgg Greuther Fürth players
1. FC Köln players
1. FC Köln II players
Hamburger SV players
Aris Thessaloniki F.C. players
FC Ingolstadt 04 players
Türkgücü München players
Bundesliga players
2. Bundesliga players
3. Liga players
UEFA Euro 2016 players
Albanian expatriate footballers
German expatriate footballers
Expatriate footballers in Greece
Albanian expatriate sportspeople in Greece
German expatriate sportspeople in Greece